
The Almonacid de la Cuba Dam was a Roman gravity dam in Almonacid de la Cuba, Zaragoza province, Aragon, Spain, dating to the 1st century AD.

See also 
 List of Roman dams and reservoirs
 Roman architecture
 Roman engineering

Notes

References

Further reading

External links 
 Roman dam Almonacid de la Cuba 

Roman dams in Spain
Gravity dams
Province of Zaragoza